Jesús Gilberto Orozco Chiquete (born 19 February 2002) is a Mexican professional footballer who plays as a defender for Liga MX club Guadalajara.

Club career
Orozco joined Guadalajara's youth academy in 2015. He was loaned out to Guadalajara's reserve team Tapatío. Under manager Víctor Manuel Vucetich, Orozco was promoted to the first team of Guadalajara and made his professional debut in the Liga MX on the 30 July 2021. He was subbed in during the 2–0 win against Club Puebla.

Career statistics

Club

References

External links
 
 
 
 Jesús Orozco at Chivas Profile (in Spanish)

2002 births
Living people
Association football defenders
C.D. Guadalajara footballers
Liga MX players
Liga de Expansión MX players
Tercera División de México players
Footballers from Jalisco
People from Zapopan, Jalisco
21st-century Mexican people
Mexican footballers